Richard Cain (October 4, 1931 – December 20, 1973), also known as Richard Scalzitti, was a notoriously corrupt Chicago police officer and a close associate of Mafia boss Sam Giancana.

Early life
Richard Cain was born to John and Lydia (née Scully) Cain  who were Irish-American and Italian-American, respectively  in Chicago, Illinois. Cain was raised in Chicago and Michigan after his parents divorced. He joined the U.S. Army at the age of 17 and was stationed in the United States Virgin Islands from 1947 to 1950. While there, he became fluent in Spanish. Before returning to Chicago in 1951, Cain worked as an investigator at the Burns Detective Agency in Dallas, Texas.

Despite his grandfather having been a prominent sewer contractor who was killed by the Chicago Outfit in Little Italy, in 1928, Cain would later become a close associate of Sam Giancana. While Cain worked as an officer in the Chicago Police Department (CPD) during the mid-1950s, he served as a bagman between corrupt police officials and the Outfit.

Double deal and disgrace
Taking a leave of absence from the CPD in 1960, Cain was assigned as an investigator for Assistant U.S. Attorney Richard Ogilvie in his investigation of Outfit boss Anthony Accardo.

Cain alluded to having been deported from Mexico in 1961 after helping train Cuban-Americans for the Bay of Pigs invasion. After his death, "Washington sources" confirmed "off-the-record" that these claims were true. He also claimed to have worked with the U.S. State Department "tracing the flow of American money into Communist hands."

Cain returned to Chicago in early 1962 to support Ogilvie in his campaign for Cook County Sheriff. In 1962, Sheriff Ogilvie appointed Cain to be the chief investigator of the Cook County Sheriff's Office. During this time, Cain led the investigation that resulted in the Fun Lounge police raid. In 1964, Cain was fired for lying to a grand jury regarding his involvement in the recovery of stolen drugs. Cain was convicted of perjury. He served six months in prison concurrent with a four-year sentence from 1968 for being an accessory to a bank robbery. Cain was paroled in 1971.

Informant and murder victim
After parole, Cain made "frequent trips" to and from Mexico as Sam Giancana's courier and financial adviser. Cain became a key figure in Giancana's money skimming from casinos in Central America and Iran. During this time, conspiring to control the city's illegal gambling operations, he began working as an FBI informant for Agent William F. Roemer, allegedly muscling out his rivals by revealing their operations to federal authorities.

On December 20, 1973, Cain was killed by masked gunmen in Rose's Sandwich Shop in Chicago. Witnesses reported that no more than 15 minutes before the attack Cain had been talking with four other men who were not present when the gunmen arrived. Two of these four men were reported to have left using a back door. At the time of the gunmen's arrival, Cain was seen talking with an unidentified woman in black. The gunmen carried a shotgun, a pistol, and a two-way radio that they used to communicate with an outside lookout. They ordered the shop's staff and patrons (including Cain) against the wall but did not speak directly to Cain. They asked several of them if they had any money and asked, "Who's got the package?" Cain was approached, pulled slightly away from the wall, and shot in the head with the shotgun. As he fell, the second gunman also shot him in the head. Cain's assailants reportedly removed an item from one of his pockets before fleeing. The unidentified woman apparently left at the same time as the gunmen.

Cain was interred in the Scully family mauseoleum at Holy Sepulchre Cemetery in Alsip, Illinois.

Possible murder motives
During the early 1970s, Cain became involved in a burglary ring masterminded by Outfit capo Marshall Caifano. It has been speculated that Caifano had learned of Cain's informant status and had received permission from Accardo to murder Cain. Caifano was reported to have been in Rose's Sandwich Shop only two hours before Cain's murder. After Cain's death, the Chicago Tribune reported that Cain had once bugged Caifano's bedroom.

Cain was also reported to have been "arguing violently" with senior Outfit figure Gus Alex shortly before Cain's death over Cain's plans to organize 12-day gambling cruises for Chicago high-rollers off the Florida coast.

Several Chicago Tribune articles printed in the days after Cain's death reported speculation by investigators that Cain's murder was in retaliation for the murder of Sam DeStefano the previous April.

Alleged involvement in the JFK assassination
According to a biography of Sam Giancana written by his family, Giancana told his younger brother that it was Cain and Charles Nicoletti, not Lee Harvey Oswald, who were in the Texas Book Depository on November 22, 1963. According to Michael J. Cain, there was no evidence to support the rumors that his half-brother was directly involved in the assassination of John F. Kennedy as a gunman.

Richard Cain was at the Criminal Courts Building 26th & California, Chicago, Illinois the day of the Kennedy assassination - per John J. Flood who worked with Richard Cain. According to historian Lamar Waldron in his book The Hidden History of the JFK Assassination (2013), Richard Cain did not shoot the president but acted as an informant on behalf of mobster John Roselli for the Chicago assassination attempt planned for November 2, 1963.

See also
List of unsolved murders

References

Further reading
 Ashman, Charles. The CIA-Mafia Link. New York: Manor Books, 1975.
 Cain, Michael J. The Tangled Web: The Life and Death of Richard Cain—Chicago Cop and Mafia Hitman. New York: Skyhorse Publishing, 2007. .
 Giancana, Sam and Chuck. Double Cross: The Explosive, Inside Story of the Mobster Who Controlled America. New York: Warner Books, 1992. .
 Hinckle, Warren and Turner, William W. The Fish Is Red: The Story of the Secret War Against Castro. New York: Harper & Row, 1981. .
 Roemer, William F., Jr. (1994) The Enforcer: Spilotro, The Chicago Mob’s Man Over Las Vegas, New York : D.I. Fine,

External links

1931 births
1973 deaths
1973 murders in the United States
American gangsters
American police officers convicted of crimes
Burials at Holy Sepulchre Cemetery (Alsip, Illinois)
Chicago Outfit mobsters
Chicago Police Department officers
Deaths by firearm in Illinois
Federal Bureau of Investigation informants
Male murder victims
Murdered American gangsters of Irish descent
Murdered American gangsters of Italian descent
People associated with the assassination of John F. Kennedy
Police misconduct in the United States
People murdered by the Chicago Outfit
People murdered in Illinois
Unsolved murders in the United States